Plateau District (District 4) is a municipal district in the city of Gatineau, Quebec. It is currently served on Gatineau City Council by Bettyna Belizaire of Action Gatineau.

The district spans the Aylmer and Hull sectors of the city, and contains the Plateau neighbourhood.

The district was created for the 2013 election from parts of Deschênes District and Plateau–Manoir-des-Trembles District.

Following the 2021 redistribution, the western half of the Plateau was transferred to the new Mitigomijokan District.

Councillors
Maxime Tremblay, Independent (2013–2017)
Maude Marquis-Bissonnette, Action Gatineau (2017–2021)
Bettyna Belizaire, Action Gatineau (2021–present)

Election results

2021

2017

2013

References

Districts of Gatineau